Los Monos Airport,  is an airstrip  southwest of Molina, a city in the Maule Region of Chile.

There is nearby high terrain southwest through north of the runway.

See also

Transport in Chile
List of airports in Chile

References

External links
OpenStreetMap - Los Monos
OurAirports - Los Monos
SkyVector - Los Monos

Airports in Chile
Airports in Maule Region